The Mystery of a Hansom Cab is a 1915 British silent crime film directed by Harold Weston and starring Milton Rosmer, Fay Temple and A.V. Bramble. It is an adaptation of Fergus Hume's 1886 novel of the same name.

Cast
 Milton Rosmer as Mark Frettleby  
 Fay Temple as Madge Frettleby  
 A.V. Bramble as Moreland  
 Arthur Walcott as Oliver White  
 James L. Dale as Brian Fitzgerald

References

Bibliography
 Low, Rachael. History of the British Film, 1914-1918. Routledge, 2005.

External links

1915 films
1915 crime films
British silent feature films
British crime films
Films directed by Harold Weston
British black-and-white films
1910s English-language films
1910s British films